In mathematics, the Stolz–Cesàro theorem is a criterion for proving the convergence of a sequence.  The theorem is named after mathematicians Otto Stolz and Ernesto Cesàro, who stated and proved it for the first time.

The Stolz–Cesàro theorem can be viewed as a generalization of the Cesàro mean, but also as a l'Hôpital's rule for sequences.

Statement of the theorem for the  case 
Let   and   be two sequences of real numbers. Assume that  is a strictly monotone and divergent sequence (i.e. strictly increasing and approaching , or strictly decreasing and approaching ) and the following limit exists:

Then, the limit

Statement of the theorem for the  case 
Let   and   be two sequences of real numbers. Assume now that  and   while  is  strictly decreasing. If 

then

Proofs

Proof of the theorem for the  case
By hypothesis, we have that for all  there exists  such that 

which is to say

Since  is strictly increasing, and the following holds
.
Next we notice that

thus, by applying the above inequality to each of the terms in the square brackets, we obtain

are infinitesimal since  and the numerator is a constant number, hence for all  there exists , such that

therefore

which concludes the proof.

Proceeding as before, for all  there exists  such that for all 

Again, by applying the above inequality to each of the terms inside the square brackets we obtain

and

The sequence  defined by

is infinitesimal, thus

combining this inequality with the previous one we conclude
 
The proofs of the other cases with  strictly increasing or decreasing and approaching  or  respectively and  all proceed in this same way.

Proof of the theorem for the  case 

This time, for each , we can write

and for any   such that for all  we have

The two sequences

thus, choosing  appropriately (which is to say, taking the limit with respect to ) we obtain

which concludes the proof.

Case 2: we assume  and  strictly decreasing. For all  there exists  such that for all 

Therefore, for each 

The sequence

Hence 
 such that 
and, choosing  conveniently, we conclude the proof

Applications and examples 
The theorem concerning the  case has a few notable consequences which are useful in the computation of limits.

Arithmetic mean

We compute

therefore

Given any sequence  of real numbers, suppose that

exists (finite or infinite), then

Geometric mean

again we compute

where we used the fact that the logarithm is continuous. Thus

since the logarithm is both continuous and injective we can conclude that
.
Given any sequence  of (strictly) positive real numbers, suppose that

exists (finite or infinite), then 

Suppose we are given a sequence  and we are asked to compute 

defining  and  we obtain

if we apply the property above

This last form is usually the most useful to compute limits
Given any sequence  of (strictly) positive real numbers, suppose that

exists (finite or infinite), then

Examples

Example 1

Example 2

History 
The ∞/∞ case is stated and proved on pages 173—175 of Stolz's 1885 book and also on page 54 of Cesàro's 1888 article. 

It appears as Problem 70 in Pólya and Szegő (1925).

The general form

Statement

Proof
The equivalent statement we shall prove is:
Let  be any two sequences of real numbers such that
 ,
 ,
then

Proof of the equivalent statement
First we notice that:
 holds by definition of limit superior and limit inferior;
 holds if and only if  because  for any sequence .
Therefore we need only to show that . If  there is nothing to prove, hence we can assume  (it can be either finite or ).
 
We can use this inequality so as to write

and we obtain

By definition of least upper bound, this precisely means that

and we are done.

Proof of the original statement
Now, take  as in the statement of the general form of the Stolz-Cesàro theorem and define

which is exactly what we wanted to prove.

References
.
.
.
.
A. D. R. Choudary, Constantin Niculescu: Real Analysis on Intervals. Springer, 2014, pp. 59-62 
J. Marshall Ash, Allan Berele, Stefan Catoiu: Plausible and Genuine Extensions of L’Hospital's Rule. Mathematics Magazine, Vol. 85, No. 1 (February 2012), pp. 52–60 (JSTOR)

External links 
 l'Hôpital's rule and Stolz-Cesàro theorem at imomath.com

Notes

Theorems in real analysis
Convergence tests